Scorţeni may refer to:

 Scorțeni, Bacău, a commune in Bacău County, Romania
 Scorțeni, Prahova, a commune in Prahova County, Romania
 Scorţeni, Teleneşti, a commune in Teleneşti district, Moldova

See also 
 Scoarța, name of two villages in Romania